Fairfax Avenue is a street in the north central area of the city of Los Angeles, California. It runs from La Cienega Boulevard in Culver City at its southern end to Hollywood Boulevard in Hollywood on its northern end. From La Cienega Boulevard (between Culver City and Mid-City) to Sunset Boulevard (between West Hollywood and Hollywood), it separates the Westside from the central part of the city along with Venice Boulevard, La Cienega Boulevard, Hauser Boulevard, San Vicente Boulevard, South Cochran Avenue, Wilshire Boulevard, 6th Street, Cochran Avenue, 4th Street, La Brea Avenue, Fountain Avenue and Sunset Boulevard.

Fairfax Avenue forms the western boundary of Hancock Park as well as Park La Brea, a 160-acre (60 ha), 4,222-unit apartment complex with over 10,000 residents.

Since World War II, the Fairfax District has been a heavily Jewish neighborhood in Mid-City West. Fairfax High School, on the corner of Fairfax and Melrose Avenue, was known as the alma mater of many entertainment industry personalities. Canter's Deli has been a late night hangout in Los Angeles since the 1940s. CBS's Television City is located on the corner of Fairfax and Beverly Boulevard, where thousands camp out to wait for a chance to watch The Price Is Right, and the former site of Gilmore Stadium, where the minor league baseball team, the Hollywood Stars, used to play prior to the Dodgers moving from Brooklyn. World-famous recording studio, Cherokee Studios, home to over 250 gold and platinum records, is just above Melrose Avenue.

The Grove is off 3rd Street and Fairfax. Due to the high density of attractions, Fairfax is one of the most congested streets in Los Angeles. Little Ethiopia is further south by Olympic Blvd and north by Pico Boulevard between the Carthay Square and Wilshire Vista neighborhoods in West Los Angeles. South of Olympic, Fairfax narrows to two lanes, Pico Boulevard between the Crestview,  Picfair Village, Wilshire Vista and Carthay Square neighborhoods in West Los Angeles and Venice Boulevard between the Crestview and Picfair Village neighborhoods in West Los Angeles and the Lafayette Square neighborhood in Mid-City.

At the northeast corner of Wilshire Boulevard and Fairfax is the former May Company department store building, which was converted to the Los Angeles County Museum of Art and will be the future home of the Academy Museum of Motion Pictures. The Petersen Automotive Museum is located on the southeast corner of Wilshire/Fairfax.

Metro Local line 217 serves Fairfax Avenue. An underground station for the Metro D Line at Wilshire Boulevard is currently under construction and is due to open in 2023.

Notable landmarks
 Canter's
 CBS Television City
 Farmers Market
 Academy Museum of Motion Pictures
 Petersen Automotive Museum

References

Streets in Los Angeles
Streets in Los Angeles County, California
Culver City, California
Fairfax, Los Angeles
Mid-Wilshire, Los Angeles
Westside (Los Angeles County)
West Los Angeles